Owen Marshall Jones  (born 17 August 1941, Te Kuiti, New Zealand), who writes under the pen name Owen Marshall, is a New Zealand short story writer and novelist. The third son of a Methodist minister younger brother of Allan Jones, and older brother of Rhys Jones, he came of age in Blenheim and Timaru, and graduated from the University of Canterbury with an MA in English in 1964. Marshall taught in a rural boys' high school for 25 years before becoming a full-time author.

Marshall has been ranked among the finest New Zealand short story writers.

Awards and honours
In 1985 and 1988, Marshall received the Lilian Ida Smith Award (Fiction). In the 2000 New Year Honours, he was appointed an Officer of the New Zealand Order of Merit, for services to literature, and in the 2012 Queen's Birthday and Diamond Jubilee Honours, he was promoted to Companion of the New Zealand Order of Merit, also for services to literature. In 2013, he was the winner of the fiction section of the Prime Minister's Awards for Literary Achievement

Works
 Supper Waltz Wilson, and Other New Zealand Stories. Christchurch : Pegasus, 1979.
 The Master of Big Jingles & Other Stories. Dunedin : McIndoe, 1982.
 The Day Hemingway Died, and Other Stories. Dunedin : McIndoe, 1984.
 The Lynx Hunter, and Other Stories. Dunedin : McIndoe, 1987.
 An indirect geography [radio narrative] by Owen Marshall. 1990.
 The Divided World : Selected Stories. Dunedin : John McIndoe, 1989.
 Tomorrow We Save the Orphans : Fiction. Dunedin : John McIndoe, 1992.
 The Ace of Diamonds Gang and Other Stories: McIndoe Press, 1993.
 Timeless Land. Painter, Grahame Sydney; poet, Brian Turner; writer, Owen Marshall; with an introduction by Sam Neill. Dunedin : Longacre Press, 1995.
 The Best of Owen Marshall's Short Stories. Auckland : Random House, 1997.
 Harlequin Rex. Auckland: Vintage, 1999. (Novel)
 When Gravity Snaps. Auckland: Vintage, 2002. (Short stories)
 The Larnachs. Auckland: Vintage, 2011. (Novel, based on events in the life of William Larnach)
 Living as a Moon. Auckland: Vintage, 2011. (Short stories)
 Love as a Stranger. Auckland: Vintage, 2016. (Novel)
 Pearly Gates''. Auckland: Vintage, 2019. (Novel)

See also 
 New Zealand literature

References

External links
 Owen Marshall website
 NZ Book Council Writer's File for Owen Marshall

1941 births
Living people
New Zealand male novelists
University of Canterbury alumni
Companions of the New Zealand Order of Merit
20th-century New Zealand novelists
New Zealand male short story writers
People from Te Kūiti
20th-century New Zealand short story writers
20th-century New Zealand male writers
New Zealand schoolteachers